In number theory, octic reciprocity is a reciprocity law relating the residues of 8th powers modulo primes, analogous to the law of quadratic reciprocity, cubic reciprocity, and quartic reciprocity.

There is a rational reciprocity law for 8th powers, due to Williams.  Define the symbol  to be +1 if x is a k-th power modulo the prime p and -1 otherwise.  Let p and q be distinct primes congruent to 1 modulo 8, such that   Let p = a2 + b2 = c2 + 2d2 and q = A2 + B2 = C2 + 2D2, with aA odd.  Then

See also
 Artin reciprocity
 Eisenstein reciprocity

References

Theorems in algebraic number theory